Remorseless Love is a 1921 American silent drama film directed by Ralph Ince and starring Elaine Hammerstein, Niles Welch and Jerry Devine.

Cast
 Elaine Hammerstein as Ruth Baird
 Niles Welch as Enoch Morrison
 Jerry Devine as Dave Hatfield
 Rae Allen as Hester Morrison
 James Seeley as Cosmo Hatfield
 Effingham Pinto as Cameron Hatfield

References

Bibliography
 Munden, Kenneth White. The American Film Institute Catalog of Motion Pictures Produced in the United States, Part 1. University of California Press, 1997.

External links
 

1921 films
1921 drama films
1920s English-language films
American silent feature films
Silent American drama films
American black-and-white films
Films directed by Ralph Ince
Selznick Pictures films
1920s American films